The following list sorts countries and territories by volume of container port traffic in Twenty-foot equivalent unit (TEU) according to data from the World Bank.

References 

container port traffic
 container port traffic